Vietnamese Australians are Australians of Vietnamese ancestry. Vietnamese Australians are one of the largest groups within the global Vietnamese diaspora. At the 2021 census, 334,781 people stated that they had Vietnamese ancestry (whether alone or in combination with another ancestry), representing 1.3% of the Australian population. In 2021, the Australian Bureau of Statistics estimated that there were 268,170 Australian residents who were born in Vietnam.

History

Up until 1975 there were fewer than 2,000 Vietnam-born people in Australia. Following the takeover of South Vietnam by the North Vietnamese communist government in April 1975, Australia, being a signatory to the Convention Relating to the Status of Refugees, agreed to resettle its share of Vietnam-born refugees under a refugee resettlement plan between 1975 and 1985.  After the initial intake of refugees in the late 1970s, there was a second immigration peak in 1983–84, most likely a result of the 1982 agreement between the Australian and Vietnamese governments (the Orderly Departure Program) which allowed relatives of Vietnamese Australians to leave Vietnam and migrate to Australia.  A third immigration peak in the late 1980s seems to have been mainly due to Australia's family reunion scheme.

By the 1990s, the number of Vietnam-born migrating to Australia had surpassed the number entering as refugees. From 1991 to 1993, the percentage of Vietnam-born migrants had reached 77 per cent of the total intake of Vietnam-born arriving in Australia, and by 2000, the percentage of Vietnam-born migrants had climbed to 98 per cent. In 2001–2002, 1,919 Vietnam-born migrants and 44 humanitarian entrants settled in Australia.

In December 2001, the Department of Foreign Affairs and Trade estimated that there were 3,950 Australian citizens that were also a Vietnamese citizen. It is not clear what proportion of this number are returned emigrants with Australian citizenship or their Vietnamese Australian-born kin, and what number is simply other Australians in Vietnam for business or for other reasons. The greater proportion (3,000) were recorded in the south of the country, with the rest dispersed through the provinces of Vietnam.

Demographics

At the 2021 census, 334,781 people stated that they had Vietnamese ancestry (whether alone or in combination with another ancestry), representing 1.3% of the Australian population. In 2021, the Australian Bureau of Statistics estimated that there were 268,170 Australian residents who were born in Vietnam. In 2021, Vietnamese Australians were the fourth largest Asian Australian ancestry after Chinese Australians, Indian Australians and Filipino Australians. In 2021 Vietnam was the sixth most common foreign country of birth.

In the 2001 census, first generation Australians of Vietnamese ancestry outnumbered second generation Australians with Vietnamese ancestry (74% : 26%) Relatively few people of Vietnamese ancestry stated another ancestry (6%). Among the leading ancestries, the proportion of people who spoke a language other than English at home was highest for those of Vietnamese (96%).

At the 2021 census, the states with the highest numbers of people nominating Vietnamese ancestry were New South Wales (124,030) and Victoria (80,787).

In Melbourne the suburbs of Richmond, Footscray, Springvale, Sunshine and St Albans have a significant proportion of Vietnamese Australians, while in Sydney they are concentrated in Cabramatta, Cabramatta West, Canley Vale, Canley Heights, Bankstown, St Johns Park and Fairfield. In Brisbane they are concentrated in Darra and Inala. There are also significant Vietnamese Australian communities in Adelaide, Canberra and Perth.

Socioeconomics
Vietnamese Australians used to vary in income and social class levels. Australian born Vietnamese Australians are highly represented in Australian universities and many professions (particularly as information technology workers, optometrists, engineers, doctors and pharmacists), whilst in the past, some members in the community were subjected to poverty and crime.

Religions
According to census data released by the Australian Bureau of Statistics in 2004, Vietnamese Australians are, by religion, 30.3 per cent Catholic, 0.4 per cent Anglican, 3.1 Other Christian, 55.2 per cent Other Religions, mainly Buddhists, Taoists, and Ancestral worshippers and 11.0 per cent have no religious beliefs.

Language
In 2001, the Vietnamese language was spoken at home by 174,236 people in Australia. Vietnamese was the sixth most widely spoken language in the country after English, Chinese, Italian, Greek and Arabic.

Vietnamese-Australian to Vietnam relationship

Media
During October 2003, government owned SBS TV began airing a Vietnamese news program called Thoi Su ('News'). The stated purpose was to provide a news service to cater for Australia's Vietnamese population. This was received poorly by the significant portion of the older generations of the Vietnamese community had previously fled after the fall of South Vietnam and still harboured resentment to the communist government and its institutions, including the state-controlled media.  Thoi Su was regarded as a mouthpiece for the ruling Vietnamese Communist Party, and uncritically endorsed government policy and practices using strong language while failing to report issues objectively including political arrests or religious oppression in Vietnam.  A large protest was convened outside SBS's offices. SBS decided to drop Thoi Su (which was being provided at no cost to SBS through a satellite connection).  SBS subsequently began broadcasting disclaimers before each foreign news program stating it does not endorse their contents.

Culture 
Besides local Vietnamese news from SBS Australia, variety shows such as Paris By Night, a mostly overseas Vietnamese production, has become well-renowned amongst Vietnamese-Australians and well as Vietnamese content from Vietnam. Figures from the show such as Nguyen Ngoc Ngan and Nguyen Cao Ky Duyen are beloved personalities by Vietnamese at large as well as many other figures such as the late Chi Tai and Hoai Linh.

Notable Australians of Vietnamese ancestry
 Anh Do – Comedian, actor, author of The Happiest Refugee and brother of Khoa Do
 Khoa Do – Young Australian of the Year in 2005, writer, director and brother of Anh Do
 Kim-Anh Do – Mathematician
 Alexandra Huynh – Soccer player, member of the Australia national women's football team
 Tien Kieu – ALP politician, member of the Legislative Council of Victoria, physicist
 Charles Tran Van Lam – Former Foreign Minister of South Vietnam (1969–1972), first Vietnamese Ambassador to Australia (late 1950s), President of the Senate of South Vietnam (1973), one of signatories of the Paris Peace Accord (1973)
 Hieu Van Le, AO – 35th governor of South Australia and Chairman of the South Australian Multicultural and Ethnic Affairs Commission (SAMEAC)
 Dai Le – Liberal Party-turned independent politician, first refugee and Vietnamese Australian to be elected to federal parliament.
 Nam Le – author of The Boat, winner of the 2008 Dylan Thomas Prize for The Boat
 Tan Le – 1998 Young Australian of the Year
 Giang Le-Huy – Actor
 Tony Le-Nguyen – Actor, writer, Director and producer
 Martin Lo – Soccer player
 Trung Ly – Martial artist/action director
 Phuong Ngo – ALP politician (member of Fairfield Council, NSW), Catholic community leader convicted for the homicide of John Paul Newman, and suspected drug lord
 Thang Ngo – Fairfield councillor (1999–2008), cast member of Once Upon a Time in Cabramatta documentary, food writer and publisher of Noodlies food blog
 Tung Ngo – ALP politician, member of the Legislative Council of South Australia
 Giang Nguyen – Mathematician and chess player
 Jillian Nguyen – actress
 Jordan Nguyen – engineer
 Luke Nguyen – chef and owner of Red Lantern in Surry Hills, Sydney and host of Luke Nguyen's Vietnam on SBS
 Nam-Trung Nguyen – Scientist
 Peter Nguyen Van Hung – Catholic priest and human rights activist on Taiwan
 Martin Nguyen – MMA Featherweight World Champion
 Rob Nguyen – Formula 3000 driver
 Sang Nguyen – Victorian ALP Upper House politician
 Tach Duc Thanh Nguyen – Convicted drug smuggler and member of the Bali Nine
 Tai Nguyen – Actor
 Van Tuong Nguyen – Executed drug trafficker
 Vincent Long Van Nguyen – Roman Catholic bishop of Parramatta 
 Ngan Phan-Koshnitsky – chess player
 Anathan 'Ana' Pham – professional video game player
 Batong Pham – ALP Upper House politician in Western Australia
 Hoa Pham – Writer
 Helen Quach – Music conductor
 Hoan Ton-That – Computer programmer and start-up entrepreneur
 Caroline Tran – Triple J announcer
 Maria Tran – actress, filmmaker
 Natalie Tran – video blogger on YouTube. The most subscribed to YouTuber from Australia. Our Natalie raking in $100,000 a year from YouTube
 Andy Trieu – Actor/martial artist
 Huong Truong – Australian Greens politician, MLC in Victoria
 Van Thanh Rudd – Political artist, nephew of Australian Prime Minister Kevin Rudd
 Vico Thai – Television and Film Actor
 San Hoa Thang, AC – Polymer chemist
 Tran My Van – Academic
 Catherine Van-Davies – Actress
 Tracy Vo – Journalist, newsreader
 Quan Yeomans – Lead singer and guitarist of Regurgitator
 Hanni Pham - member of South Korean group NewJeans

See also

 Asian Australians
 Australia–Vietnam relations
 Pháp Hoa Temple

References

External links

 Vietnamese Community in Australia
 The Vietnamese in Australia 
 Gold & Silver: Vietnamese migration and relationships with environments in Vietnam and Sydney
 Vietnamese Queenslanders. Short (3-4mins) digital stories from 5 Vietnamese Queenslanders, a project from the Queensland Vietnamese community and the State Library of Queensland.
  [CC-By-SA] (History of Vietnamese in Sydney)

 
Immigration to Australia
Asian Australian
Australian
Australia–Vietnam relations